Giovanni Battista Pisani, also known as Gio. Battista Pisani, was a 17th-century Genoese mathematician.

Biography 
He wrote The First Book of Modern Cursive Letters (Il primo libro di lettere corsive moderne, 1641) about calligraphy, followed by other educational works, Arithmetic Memorial (Memoriale aritmetico, 1644) and Arithmetic Garden (Giardino aritmetico, 1646), intended to solve arithmetic problems that were especially related to merchant activity.

Works

References

17th-century deaths
17th-century Italian mathematicians
Scientists from Genoa